HMS Goldfinch was an  built for the Royal Navy. Completed in 1911, the ship spent her career in home waters and participated in the First World War as part of the Grand Fleet. She was wrecked in fog on Start Point, Sanday, one of the northern Orkney Isles, on the night of 18–19 February 1915. Her wreck was broken up for scrap in April 1919.

Description
Ordered as part of the 1909–1910 Naval Programme, the Acorn-class ships were improved versions of the earlier . The ship was powered by a single Parsons steam turbine set which drove three propeller shafts using steam provided by four Yarrow boilers. Their crew numbered 70 officers and ratings.

The ships were armed with a pair of BL  Mk VIII gun in single mounts, one on the forecastle and the other on the stern and a pair of quick-firing (QF) 12-pounder guns, one on each broadside between the two forward funnels. Their torpedo armament consisted of two rotating torpedo tubes for 21-inch (533 mm) torpedoes amidships.

Construction and service
Goldfinch was laid down at Fairfield Shipbuilding and Engineering Company's Govan, Glasgow shipyard on 23 February 1910 and was launched on 12 July 1910 and was completed in February 1911.

On commissioning, Goldfinch joined the Second Destroyer Flotilla. On the night of 11 March 1911, a fire broke out in the radio room of Goldfinch while alongside at Devonport, destroying the radio equipment. Goldfinch remained part of the Second Flotilla in February 1913.

On the outbreak of the First World War in August 1914, the 2nd Destroyer Flotilla, including Goldfinch, joined the newly established Grand Fleet. Goldfinch ran aground on Start Point, Sanday in the Orkney Islands in fog on the night of 18/19 February 1915. While none of her crew was killed, Goldfinch was wrecked. The ship's remains were sold for scrap in 1919.

References

Bibliography

External links
Photo of HMS Goldfinch
Bow/forefoot of HMS Goldfinch on Start Point

 

Acorn-class destroyers
World War I destroyers of the United Kingdom
Shipwrecks of Scotland
World War I shipwrecks in the North Sea
Maritime incidents in 1915
Ships built on the River Clyde
1910 ships